The Regional School Unit 22 (R.S.U. 22), known as Maine School Administrative District 22 (M.S.A.D. 22) before July 1, 2013, is a school district in the U.S. state of Maine, serving residents of the towns of Hampden, Newburgh, Winterport, and Frankfort.

Schools

Elementary schools
Leroy H. Smith School in Winterport
Earl McGraw School (K–2) in Hampden
George B. Weatherbee School (3–5) in Hampden

Middle schools
Reeds Brook Middle School in Hampden
Wagner Middle School in Winterport

High schools
Hampden Academy, serving all Newburgh, Winterport, Frankfort and Hampden students

References

External links

22
Education in Penobscot County, Maine
Education in Waldo County, Maine